James William Acaster (born 9 January 1985) is an English comedian, writer, presenter and musician. As well as appearances on panel shows, he is known for the stand-up specials Repertoire, co-hosting the food podcast Off Menu and co-presenting the panel show Hypothetical. He has won four Chortle Awards.

After attempting to pursue a music career as a drummer, Acaster began performing stand-up comedy in 2008. He drew acclaim for his stand-up shows at the Edinburgh Festival Fringe, where he has been nominated for Best Comedy Show five times. Four of his Fringe performances were adapted into the serialised Netflix specials Repertoire: "Recognise", "Represent", "Reset" and "Recap". His more recent special Cold Lasagne Hate Myself 1999 (2019) won a Melbourne International Comedy Festival Award.

As a presenter, Acaster began the food podcast Off Menu with Ed Gamble in 2018, and has co-hosted four series of the Dave panel show Hypothetical from 2019 onwards. He has appeared as a guest on panel shows including Taskmaster, The Big Fat Quiz of the Year, Would I Lie to You?, 8 out of 10 Cats and Mock the Week.

Acaster's radio appearances on Widdicombe's XFM show led to a recurring segment called Classic Scrapes, in which he shared mistakes that got him into unfortunate circumstances. He developed this into a book, James Acaster's Classic Scrapes (2017), which made The Sunday Times Bestseller List. Acaster's second book, Perfect Sound Whatever (2019), also became a Sunday Times Bestseller; it follows Acaster's life in 2017 via reviews of albums that were released in 2016. A tie-in podcast, James Acaster's Perfect Sounds, aired on BBC Sounds. His third book, James Acaster's Guide to Quitting Social Media: Being the Best YOU You Can Be and Saving Yourself from Loneliness: Vol. 1, was released in August 2022, becoming his third Sunday Times Best Seller.

Early life
James William Acaster was born in Kettering on 9 January 1985. He attended Montagu Secondary School and studied music at Northampton College. He later worked as a teaching assistant in a school for autistic children, using his free time to begin performing stand-up comedy.

Acaster played the drums in various bands around his hometown prior to his comedy career, including The Wow! Scenario and the Capri-Sun Quartet. As a member of the latter, he used the stage name Sir William Strawberry. After The Wow! Scenario broke up, he pursued comedy while "deciding what [he] really wanted to do". The Wow! Scenario recorded an album entitled Stand in the Star: A Verse and a Chorus in 2007, but did not release it; Acaster announced in 2017 that he had reunited with the band to finish the album and that it would be available the following year, but it remains unreleased.

Career

2008–2013: Early career
Acaster began performing stand-up comedy in 2008. In 2009, he performed in a show at the Edinburgh Festival Fringe with fellow comedians Josh Widdicombe and Nick Helm. In 2010 and 2011 he supported Josie Long and Milton Jones on tour respectively.

In 2011 he also appeared on Russell Howard's Good News Extra and Dave's One Night Stand, and performed his first solo show at the Edinburgh Festival, Amongst Other Things, which he toured across the UK the following year. Acaster appeared in Australia Versus, in addition to Chris Addison's E4 programme Show and Tell, and was the co-host of My First Gig on Resonance FM radio.

Acaster's 2012 Edinburgh show was called Prompt. It received a nomination from the Foster's Edinburgh Comedy Awards for the best comedy show at the festival in 2012.

Acaster began appearing on his friend Josh Widdicombe's radio programme on XFM in 2012, initially being asked to share a story about a strange situation he had got himself into in the past. His first story proved popular enough that he was asked to continue sharing a story each week. These stories, dubbed "scrapes" by Josh and later "classic scrapes" by the programme's listeners, became a recurring segment known as 'James Acaster's Classic Scrapes'. Acaster's stories included going line dancing with his brother on Valentine's day, inadvertently scaring the actor Adewale Akinnuoye-Agbaje in a Chiquito restaurant, and later being tormented by a friend's son in the form of pranks involving cabbage.

Acaster performed Prompt at 14 venues in England and Wales between January and March 2013, after which he appeared at the New Zealand International Comedy Festival. He won the New Zealand Comedy Guild's best international act award in December 2013.

Acaster's 2013 Edinburgh show Lawnmower was staged at the Pleasance Courtyard. It was nominated for the Foster's Edinburgh Comedy Award 2013 for the best comedy show. In September 2013, he made his first appearance on the BBC musical comedy panel show Never Mind the Buzzcocks. He completed his UK tour of Lawnmower at a hometown gig in Kettering on 30 November 2013.

Acaster starred in various segments of radio, including the half-hour programme "James Acaster's Findings – Bread" for BBC Radio 4, also featuring Nathaniel Metcalfe and Bryony Hannah. A series of four episodes of "James Acaster's Findings" was recorded in June and July 2014. The first of these episodes was broadcast on 5 November 2014. Acaster also regularly appeared on Josh Widdicombe's XFM radio show, where he was a fan favourite due to a segment involving anecdotes of his known as "classic scrapes" (most of which were subsequently compiled in a book in 2017). His series Sweet Home Ketteringa (2014) follows him on a journey of discovery around his hometown, exploring its history and nascent rivalries with proximal town Corby, sparked by a Primark store opening in the latter town.

2014–2018: Repertoire
Acaster's 2014 Edinburgh show was called Recognise. The show was previewed in April and May in Australia and New Zealand, where it won the New Zealand International Comedy Festival Award for Best International Show. Recognise was again nominated for the Foster's Edinburgh Comedy Award 2014 for the best comedy show – the third time in a row for Acaster. It was performed at over 30 British venues during autumn 2014, including a two-week run at the Soho Theatre in December due to the success of the October dates at the same venue.

Acaster's 2015 Edinburgh show was called Represent, again performed at the Pleasance Courtyard. It earned Acaster his 4th consecutive Edinburgh Comedy Award nomination for Best Show, becoming the second artist to do so after Al Murray. The UK tour of this show ran from October to December 2015, ending at the Lyric Theatre, Shaftesbury Avenue. Due to the show's success, Acaster took Represent to the Soho Theatre for a week-long run in March 2016.

In 2015 he won the Chortle awards for Best Breakthrough Act and Best Show for Recognise.

Acaster's 2016 show was called Reset. It was previewed at the Melbourne International Comedy Festival, and the New Zealand International Comedy Festival in Auckland and Wellington, both in April/May 2016, then at the Udderbelly Festival in June 2016, and finally at The Tringe Festival in Tring in July. Acaster performed this show at the Edinburgh Fringe Festival in August 2016, where he became the first comedian to receive a fifth nomination for best show at the festival. In June 2016, Acaster appeared as a guest on Russell Howard's Stand Up Central. In July 2016, Acaster performed in the comedy tent at Latitude Festival. In September 2016, he wrote a pilot episode for a new sitcom, We The Jury, which was broadcast by the BBC.

In 2017, Acaster took Recognise, Represent, and Reset to various venues, performing one show each night over three nights as The Trelogy. A further show of previously performed material, Recap, was also developed to tie the shows together thematically. These four shows were filmed in September for a Netflix special. His first book, James Acaster's Classic Scrapes, recounting the stories he told on Josh Widdicombe's XFM radio show and podcast, was published in August, followed by a book-reading tour in autumn 2017. Classic Scrapes appeared on The Sunday Times best-seller list. In November, he turned on the Christmas lights in Kettering.

In March 2018, Acaster released his serialised Netflix stand-up comedy special, Repertoire. It consists of four separate hour-long stand-up comedy performances, all filmed in September 2017: "Recognise", "Represent", "Reset", and "Recap". In July 2018, Acaster performed on the Comedy Stage at the Cornbury Music Festival. In December 2018, he began a weekly podcast with Ed Gamble called Off Menu. In the podcast, Gamble and Acaster invite a special guest to discuss their dream starter, main course, side, dessert and drink.

2019–present: Cold Lasagne and books
In 2019, Acaster won the Chortle Award for Best Show with Cold Lasagne Hate Myself 1999. Perfect Sound Whatever is Acaster's second book, about an obsessive challenge that he undertook in 2017 to collect as much music released in 2016 as possible. It was published by Headline Publishing Group in August 2019. In 2019, Acaster won the Melbourne International Comedy Festival Award, making him the first UK comedian to do so in nine years. Acaster's podcast with BBC Sounds, James Acaster's Perfect Sounds, started in April 2020.

Acaster, Romesh Ranganathan, and James Corden voiced three mice and appeared as three transformed footmen in the 2021 film Cinderella. In 2022, he published the book James Acaster's Guide to Quitting Social Media: Vol. 1.

His special Cold Lasagne Hate Myself 1999 was released on Vimeo in March 2021. It was nominated for a Critics Choice Award for Best Comedy Special in 2022.

In November 2022, Acaster announced a new musical project called Temps, a music collective of 40 individuals. Members of the collective submit music without being given direction, and Acaster combines the contributions. Acaster formed the group through email communication in the COVID-19 pandemic with musicians he contacted while working on Perfect Sound Whatever. He had planned to create a mockumentary with Louis Theroux's production company in which he would transition into the music industry, but this was abandoned when the pandemic began.

Their debut album, "Party Gator Purgatory" is set to be released by Bella Union on May 19, 2023 and explores genres including alt-rock, hip-hop and jazz. Acaster has created its artwork with highlighter pens. The lead single "no,no" was released in November 2022; the music video features Acaster in his "Party Gator" costume, with performing artists on the track including Quelle Chris, Xenia Rubinos, Nnamdi Ogbonnaya, Shamir, and Seb Rochford. The second single, "bleedthemtoxins", was released on 31 January 2023.

Personal life
He dated English comedian Louise Ford until she left him for Rowan Atkinson in 2013. He then dated New Zealand comedian Rose Matafeo from 2014 to 2017.

Acaster is an advocate for therapy and counselling and has commented on the importance of talking and reducing the stigma around mental health. 

He is a supporter of Kettering Town FC.

Filmography

Bibliography

Awards and nominations

References

External links
 
 
 Sweet Home Ketteringa – 2014–2015 comic docu-series presented by Acaster about his hometown
 , October 2014

1985 births
21st-century English comedians
Comedians from Northamptonshire
English male comedians
Living people
People from Kettering
English autobiographers